This is the list of the 100 best-selling singles of 2010 in France. Rankings are based on the combined sales of physical and digital singles.

Top 100 singles

See also 
 2010 in music
 List of number-one hits (France)
 List of number-one hits of 2010 (France)
 List of artists who reached number one on the French Singles Chart

References

Top 100 singles
France
Top 100 singles